The mazanki is a Czech folk musical instrument.

Mazanki may also refer to the following places in Poland:
Mazanki, Kuyavian-Pomeranian Voivodeship (north-central Poland)
Mazanki, Warmian-Masurian Voivodeship (north-east Poland)